Thanet  is a local government district in Kent, England. Formed under the Local Government Act 1972, it came into being on 1 April 1974 and is  governed by Thanet District Council.

On the north eastern tip of Kent, it is predominantly coastal, with north, east and southeast facing coastlines, and is bordered by the City of Canterbury district to the west and the Dover district to the south. The main towns are Margate, Ramsgate and Broadstairs.

History

The Isle of Thanet is the major part of the district. Formed over 7,000 years ago and separated from the mainland by the Wantsum Channel, it has always borne the brunt of invasions from the Continent. An Isle of Thanet Rural District had existed from the Local Government Act 1894 until it was abolished in 1935 to form part of Eastry Rural District. The current District was formed in 1974, by the addition of the area over which was once the Wantsum Channel, including the settlement of Sarre.

Governance

The District Council is held by a Labour minority with support from Greens and Independents, following a vote of no confidence in the Conservative Leader, Cllr Bob Bayford.

There are two MPs for Thanet:
Roger Gale, Conservative MP for North Thanet,
Craig MacKinlay, Conservative MP for South Thanet.

Responsibilities
Thanet district council is responsible for providing clear leadership to the community and continuously to improve the  delivery of local services.  These services include: leisure, environmental health, housing — including the provision of social housing and housing benefit and rubbish collection.  (First tier authorities have no responsibility for highways and under statute this function cannot be passed between different levels of local government.)  Kent County Council is responsible for more strategic services such as education, libraries, main roads, social services, trading standards and transport.

Organisation
The powers of the council are specified in its constitution in accordance with the Local Government Act 2000.

The council is a cabinet-style council with a leader and the cabinet itself, which is formed by the majority party in the district.  Decisions on the council's services are made by the executive (or cabinet) which comprises five councillors. Each member of the cabinet holds a separate portfolio.  The leader and cabinet are responsible for policies, plans and strategies, and for recommending them to the overall council, which is convened as a whole, at regular council meetings.  The full council consists of 56 councillors.

The cabinet is held to account by the remainder of the councillors acting as overview and scrutiny who verify that decisions are appropriate and can prevent a decision taking immediate effect.

Officers
Councillors are responsible for the appointment and oversight of officers, who are delegated to perform most tasks. The chief executive officer, has overall responsibility for council employees and operates in conjunction with department heads.

Parishes
The civil parishes located in the district are:
Acol
Birchington
Broadstairs
Cliffsend
Manston
Minster
Monkton
Ramsgate
St Nicholas at Wade with Sarre

The town of Margate comprises an unparished area. The Thanet councillors representing the wards covering Margate act as charter trustees, choosing one of their number to be the mayor of Margate each year. The chairs of the town councils for Ramsgate and Broadstairs also take the title of mayor.

Elections
See Thanet District Council elections for historic political control and leadership.

Elections are held every four years. The most recent election on 2 May 2019 saw the council remain under no overall control. A minority Conservative administration formed after the election, but was replaced by a minority Labour administration in October 2019. That administration lasted until June 2021, when another minority Conservative administration, led by Ash Ashbee managed to take control of the council. The next election is due in 2023.

Electoral wards
The district is divided into 23 electoral wards.

Premises
The council is based at the Council Offices on Cecil Street in the centre of Margate. The building was originally designed in the early 1970s to be a new headquarters for Margate Borough Council, but by the time the building was finished in 1974 that council had been abolished and absorbed into the larger Thanet District Council. The building was formally opened on 9 April 1975.

Demography

According to the 2011 census, the population of Thanet was 134,186, an increase of about 6000 in the ten years since the previous census.

Economy
The whole district suffers from seasonal unemployment, in spite of its proximity to London, because of various factors, among them being inward migration, high numbers of old people, and low numbers of affluent people. It is not helped by poor overall indicators for health. In a study of resilience to economic downturns, Thanet was poorly rated at 295th out of 324 districts. Unemployment levels are nearly twice the South East of England as a whole, and as a result a great deal of planning is being done to encourage more businesses to relocate to the District. The  Thanet & East Kent Chamber produces a weekly business digest, the Thanet & East Kent Insider, which reports on economic activity in the private and public sectors.

New projects underway include: A new community centre for Broadstairs. Redevelopment and renovations are to be undertaken at Margate's Dreamland (a Heritage Amusement Park); Cliftonville (Lido site); and a Holiday Inn (hotel), now open. A large retail and residential development on Ramsgate seafront, known as Royal Sands, started construction in 2011 but was quickly halted. A multimillion-pound art gallery The Turner Contemporary (opened by Tracey Emin in April 2011) in Margate and this has created the opening of many new shops in the Margate old town and visitor numbers have far exceeded expectation. Margate has been chosen as a Mary Portas retail town. Large investment and building work is taking place in schools across the island.

In addition, the District Council has introduced an empty property initiative and has compulsory purchased empty and derelict buildings with the objective of bringing them back into use.

The Thanet Offshore Wind Project, near North Foreland, began operating in September 2010. The project is expected to have a total capacity of up to 300 MW which, on average, is sufficient to supply approximately 240,000 homes with green energy. The project will thus make a significant contribution to the government's national and regional renewable energy targets. Thanet Earth is the largest greenhouse development in the UK, covering an area of 91 hectares with 7 greenhouses each the size of 10 football pitches producing cucumbers, tomatoes and peppers all year.

Margate, Ramsgate and Broadstairs each have shopping centres with a mix of local and national retailers complemented by Northdown Road, Cliftonville, Westgate and Birchington. Westwood at the centre of Thanet has seen much major development in recent years with the building of Westwood Cross shopping centre which is the home of national retailers and several restaurant chains including a Travelodge hotel. Associated development has taken place around the shopping centre spawning other retail parks. National retailer Primark opened a new superstore in October 2012, the largest Primark store in Kent.

Transport

The rail connections are via the Chatham Main Line through Margate to Ramsgate, and the Ashford to Ramsgate (via Canterbury West) line. New high-speed rail links from London to Thanet began in December 2009, and it is now possible to travel from Margate to St Pancras railway station at an average speed of 96 kmh (around 60 mph); maximum speed of 225 km/h (around 140 mph). This will form part of the UK's first true high-speed commuter service, according to the South Eastern Railway Company. Main road links are the A28 which brings traffic from Canterbury and Ashford; and the A299, north coast route. The Saxon Shore Way Long distance footpath skirts the coast.

There is an airport, now closed, at Manston, formerly RAF Manston, but later renamed by its commercial operators as Kent International Airport. The airport closed permanently on 15 May 2014. Because it was used as a U.S. airbase during the Second World War it has one of the longest runways in the UK, and while open it was designated by the United Nations as an emergency landing site for aircraft in trouble.

Ferry services are no longer running from the Port of Ramsgate, and the council is currently in dispute with the former operators over the payment of £3.3 million

Health
Thanet has a large hospital: the Queen Elizabeth The Queen Mother Hospital, known as the QEQM. Extension work which started in 2007 has made the QEQM a major hospital site.

As of July 2010, overall indicators of health were poor for Thanet:
 Health is worse in Thanet than in England on average
 Life expectancy is lower than for England
 There are health inequalities: in deprived areas life expectancy is 5 years lower for women and 10 years lower for men
 Teenage pregnancies are high compared to the England average
 Estimated smoking rates are average but death rates from smoking are significantly higher
 Binge drinking is around the national average
 Children are significantly less active than average
 Significantly higher than average number of people admitted to hospital for alcohol-specific conditions
 Significantly higher than average rate of diabetes
 Significantly higher than average rate of mental health problems

Media
Local newspapers are the Thanet Extra, part of the KM Group;  Isle of Thanet Gazette and Thanet Times (merged with Adscene, October 2009), (the Thanet Times was withdrawn in October 2012) all owned by Northcliffe Media; and the midweek Your Thanet published online by KOS Media. The county-wide newspaper Kent on Saturday also serves the district.

Local radio stations are;

KMFM Thanet (previously known as Thanet Local Radio) owned by the KM Group. (All Programmes are networked with other KM Kent stations).
Community non-commercial station Academy FM Thanet on 107.8FM and online and via mobile app it broadcasts from within Marlowe Academy, Ramsgate.
The county-wide Heart Kent
BBC Radio Kent

National TV stations carry regional news:
The ITV1 service is provided currently by Meridian Broadcasting; and the BBC South East Today.

Thanet also has a local online radio and podcasting service currently operating online only known as 'Thanet Community Radio' (TCR). The station works closely with Dover-based 'Dover Community Radio' (DCR) which operates in a similar way.

Education

Thanet has a wide variety of local schools including approximately 41 primary schools such as Drapers Mills, Palm Bay, and Upton. Outstanding secondary schools include Dane Court Grammar, and Chatham and Clarendon Grammar. The community learning within the district is varied and wide, including charitable training organisations such as East Kent ITeC Ltd, and organisations such as Margate Adult Education Centre, Thanet Skills Studio and Thanet Stage School. East Kent College is a provider of further education in Thanet and a Training Provider that works with local businesses to raise the level of education across the region.  Canterbury Christ Church University currently has a campus in Broadstairs, serving Media, Art and Design subjects.

Climate
Thanet enjoys a maritime climate, being surrounded on three sides by the sea. This generally results in mild winters and warm, dry summers.

References

 
Non-metropolitan districts of Kent